The FIL European Luge Natural Track Championships 1974 took place in Niedernsill, Austria.

Men's singles

Graber becomes the first non-Austrian to win the men's singles event at the natural track European Championships.

Women's singles

Men's doubles

Medal table

References
Men's doubles natural track European champions
Men's singles natural track European champions
Women's singles natural track European champions

FIL European Luge Natural Track Championships
Kitzbühel Alps
1974 in luge
1974 in Austrian sport
Luge in Austria
International sports competitions hosted by Austria